Baki (or Burumba) is an Oceanic language spoken on Epi Island, in Vanuatu.

References

Epi languages
Vulnerable languages